A fatberg is a rock-like mass of waste matter in a sewer system formed by the combination of flushed non-biodegradable solids, such as wet wipes, and fat, oil and grease (FOG) deposits. The handling of FOG waste and the buildup of its deposits are a long-standing problem in waste management, with "fatberg" a more recent neologism. Fatbergs have formed in sewers worldwide, with the rise in usage of disposable (so-called "flushable") cloths. Several prominent examples were discovered in the 2010s in Great Britain, their formation accelerated by aging Victorian sewers. Fatbergs are costly to remove, and have given rise to public awareness campaigns about flushable waste.

Formation
Fatbergs form at the rough surfaces of sewers where the fluid flow becomes turbulent. In pipes and tubes with smooth inner linings, fluid near the containing wall flows only slightly slower than fluid in the central channel of the pipe; thus, the whole volume of fluid flows smoothly and freely. When fluid encounters an obstruction, a resulting swirl of water starts trapping debris. Fatbergs occur in sewer systems around the globe, in cities and smaller towns.

An obstruction can be any type of rough surface capable of snagging debris. In brick or concrete sewers there may be surplus cement drips, damaged brickwork, or loose mortar joints damaged by frost heave. In any sub-surface pipe, even of the most advanced design, penetration by foreign intrusions such as tree roots is a commonplace cause of a fatberg blockage.

Fatbergs are not just the result of fats that have congealed through cooling. The lipids in fatbergs have undergone a process of saponification. Fatbergs thus require four main components: calcium, free fatty acids, FOG, and water. Comprising not only wet wipes and fat, fatbergs may contain other items that do not break apart or dissolve when flushed down the toilet, such as sanitary napkins, cotton buds, needles, condoms and food waste washed down kitchen sinks. The resulting lumps of congealed material can be as strong as concrete, and require specialist equipment to remove. In the United States, almost half of all sewer blockages are caused by grease, combined with the evergrowing use of wipes that end up in sewer systems.

Impact 
Fatbergs can cause blockages in sewer systems. Giant fatbergs have blocked sewers in London, New York, Denver, Valencia, and Melbourne. Blocked fat reacts with the lining of the pipe and undergoes saponification, converting the oil into a solid, soap-like substance. Grease and fat blockages can cause sanitary sewer overflows, in which sewage is discharged into the environment without treatment.

Fatbergs have been considered as a source of fuel, specifically biogas.

Mitigation 
Fatbergs can be mitigated through public awareness campaigns about flushable waste and grease traps for filtration at the source. Campaigns have been launched against wet wipes because of their effect on sewer systems, most notably by Surfers Against Sewage and the Marine Conservation Society, among other environmental NGOs, who called on the UK's Advertising Standards Authority to end “misleading” branding and packaging.

In 2022, Australia and New Zealand developed a product labelling standard to help determine if a product is flushable.

Etymology

Fatberg is a compound of the words fat and iceberg. The word was used in 2008 to describe "large, rock-like lumps of cooking fat" washing up on beaches in Wales, and by 2010 was used in reference to sewer-blocking fat deposits in London.

The word was added to Oxford Dictionaries Online in 2015. The term is used by authorities at Thames Water and South West Water, both in southern England.

Notable fatbergs
 1 September 2014: A solid mass of waste fat, wet wipes, food, tennis balls and wood planks, the size of a Boeing 747 aeroplane was discovered and cleared by sanitation workers in a drain beneath a  section of road in Shepherd's Bush, London.
 3 September 2014: The sewerage system beneath Melbourne, Australia was clogged by a large mass of fat, grease and waste.
 January 2015: As part of a campaign against drain blocking, Welsh Water released a video showing a fatberg in drains in Cardiff.
 April 2015: A  fatberg was removed from sewers under Chelsea. It took over two months to remove, and the damage it caused cost an estimated £400,000 to repair.
 July 2015: A  fatberg was discovered in Welshpool in mid-Wales.
 January 2016: A blockage caused by a fatberg near Newcastle, New South Wales, Australia, damaged the Eleebana sewage pumping station.

Even working seven days a week at a cost of £1 million per month, officials estimated it would take two months to destroy it. Two pieces of the fatberg were cut off on 4 October 2017 and, after several weeks of drying, were displayed at the Museum of London from 9 February 2018 through June 2018, as part of the museum's City Now City Future season. According to curator Vyki Sparkes, the fatberg became one of the museum's most popular exhibits.
 April 2018: A fatberg discovered under South Bank in London is suspected to be larger than the one found under Whitechapel.
 12 September 2018: Workers in Macomb County, Michigan discovered a fatberg 100 feet long, 11 feet wide and as much as 6 feet tall. The Michigan Science Center launched a 'fatberg' exhibit in December 2018, which included real pieces from the mass found in September.
Workers took eight weeks to remove it. It was the largest fatberg discovered in the UK outside a major city, and the largest in the history of South West Water.
 February 2019: The largest fatberg in the UK was discovered in a sewer at Birchall Street in Liverpool. It proved to be difficult to break down using conventional tools and equipment. It was finally removed in May 2021 using a new method of clearing, which consisted of workers feeding a steel rope through it and then cutting it with a jet.
December 2019: A large fatberg in the north of England was reported by United Utilities under HM Prison Manchester. The  fatberg was estimated to weigh "around the same as three elephants", taking several weeks to remove fully.
April 2020: A  fatberg the size of a petrol tanker was discovered in Melbourne, Australia. Its unusually large size in relation to other Australian blockages (far exceeding the 2014 and 2016 Australian fatbergs) was blamed primarily on the shortage of toilet paper caused by the COVID-19 outbreak.
26 June 2020: Two years after a large mass of fat was jet cleaned from Gisborne's sewer network in New Zealand, a half-tonne fatberg built up in the same place. The second fatberg caused an overflow of the wastewater system, which the Gisborne District Council attributed to COVID-19 claiming that they "had significant problems with pump stations blocking because more people were at home and their behaviour had changed."
October 2020: A 10-tonne fatberg made up of grease, fat, and wet wipes was removed from sewers under Cadogan Place in London, England.
February 2021: A "huge and disgusting" fatberg described as having the same weight as a bungalow was removed from under Yabsley Street in Canary Wharf, London, England.
April 2021: A giant fatberg, weighing about 300 tonnes, was found to be clogging a sewer in the Hodge Hill area of Birmingham, England. Severn Trent commented that it was estimated to be one of the biggest blockages they had ever dealt with.

References

Sewerage
Sewerage infrastructure